Nebioğlu (former Karaevli) is a belde (town) in Çaycuma district of Zonguldak Province, Turkey. Situated at  it is one of the easternmost settlements of the province. The population of Nebipğlu is 2350. as of 2010. The town was established in 1999 by merging four nearby villages. Agriculture and dairying are two of the major economic dsectors of the town.

References  

Populated places in Zonguldak Province
Towns in Turkey
Çaycuma